Chestnut Hill Branch refers to the following rail lines:
Chestnut Hill Branch (Pennsylvania Railroad), now the Chestnut Hill West Branch
Chestnut Hill Branch (Reading Company), now the Chestnut Hill East Branch